Cesare Gussoni (born 20 January 1934) is an Italian former football referee.

He served as referee 106 times in Serie A between 1966 and 1978. He also refereed the 1977 Coppa Italia Final.

At international level, he refereed twice in the 1978 FIFA World Cup qualifiers: in Greece–Soviet Union on 10 May 1977 and in Hong Kong–Iran on 19 June 1977. He also served as a linesman in the 1976 European Cup Final.

In 1978, Gussoni was awarded the Giovanni Mauro Award as the best referee of the season.  In 2013, he was inducted into the Italian Football Hall of Fame.

Honours
Giovanni Mauro Award: 1978
Italian Football Hall of Fame: 2013

References

External links
 

1934 births
Possibly living people
Italian football referees